A Lady Named Smith is the twentieth solo studio album by American country singer Connie Smith. It was released in May 1973 via Columbia Records and contained 11 tracks. The album was her first with the Columbia label. Its production and style featured a string instrumentation to help market Smith in the pop field. Included were a mix of new material and covers of previously-recorded songs by other artists. The album's only single was the original tune, "You've Got Me (Right Where You Want Me)", which reached the American country songs chart in 1973. A Lady Named Smith would also chart on the American country albums chart in 1973.

Background
Between 1964 and 1973, Connie Smith was signed to the RCA Victor label and had eighteen top ten singles. By 1973, Smith had become increasingly dissatisfied with RCA Victor and ultimately left the label after her contract was not altered to her specified needs. Instead, she signed with Columbia Records and was permitted to record one gospel album per year. 

At Columbia, she met with executive Clive Davis, who agreed to produce her. However, Columbia dismissed Davis from the label and Smith began working on her first album with producer Billy Sherrill. However, the pair disagreed on religion, Smith being more religious than Sherrill: "The first time we met after I signed, we had an argument. He said 'there was no such thing as sin.' That became an ongoing thing, and part of it was my fault," Smith later reflected. Instead, Billy Sherrill arranged for George Richey to produce Smith's first Columbia album. Richey had recently had success as a songwriter for George Jones and Tammy Wynette. He had also previously produced albums for Dick Curless and Wynn Stewart. Richey would craft Smith's first Columbia disc titled A Lady Named Smith.

Recording and content
The recording process for A Lady Named Smith occurred over the course of four 1973 sessions: January 22, January 23, January 26 and February 2. Four overdub sessions were also added that included string instrumentation. The sessions occurred at Columbia Studio B, located in Nashville, Tennessee. George Richey produced both the original and overdub sessions. Biographer Barry Mazor found the album to be crafted in a "Countrypolitan Sound", that featured a "lush chorus and string embellishments". The sound was created because Columbia believed Smith to have pop potential. Smith herself feared the new pop approach would shy away her fans but agreed to try it because she found "good songs". A Lady Named Smith consisted of 11 tracks. Its opening track, "You've Got Me (Right Where You Want Me)" was co-written by Smith and Richey. "It was a really good songwriting collaboration," Smith recalled in 2021. Another new track was "The House Where Love Shines", which was penned by Smith's friend and songwriter, Dallas Frazier. A third new track was "Love Held on to Me". It was penned by Helen Cornelius, who would later have success as a country music artist. 

Several album tracks were covers of previously-recorded songs by other artists. Among these recordings was the track "Soul Song", which was penned by George Richey and was a number one country single by Joe Stampley in 1972. Another cover was "Pass Me By (If You're Only Passing Through)", which was first a single by Johnny Rodriguez several months prior to Smith's recording. Rodriguez's version reached the top ten of the American country chart. A third cover was "A Picture of Me (Without You)", which had been a top five country single for George Jones. Smith also covered Don Gibson's "Too Soon to Know", which he first recorded in 1958. "I picked that song because I loved it!" she later told Barry Mazor. As promised by Columbia, Smith was allowed to include two gospel selections per secular album, a theme that she would continue at the label. When choosing the two gospel songs for the collection, Smith said that she chose material that she "thought would fit the album more" and "would have a message".

Release, chart performance and singles
A Lady Named Smith was released by Columbia Records in May 1973. It was Smith's first album with the label and the twenty second studio album released in her career. The label distributed it as a vinyl LP, with five songs on "side A" and six songs on "side B". Columbia also issued a cassette version that had an identical track listing. The album debuted on the American Billboard Top Country Albums chart on May 26, 1973. It spent five weeks on the chart and peaked at the number 31 position on June 16, 1973. It was Smith's third album to peak in the top 40. The album's only single was the track "You've Got Me (Right Where You Want Me)". Columbia released the single in March 1973. The single peaked at number 21 on the Billboard Hot Country Songs chart in May 1973. It was her first career solo single to miss the Billboard top 20.

Track listing

Personnel
All credits are adapted from the liner notes of A Lady Named Smith and the biography booklet by Barry Mazor titled The Latest Shade of Blue.

Musical personnel
 Byron Bach – Cello
 Brenton Banks – Strings
 Harold Bradley – Guitar
 Jimmy Capps – Guitar
 Jerry Carrigan – Drums
 Marvin Chantry – Strings
 Ray Edenton – Rhythm guitar
 Carol Gorodetzky – Strings
 Lennie Haight – Strings
 John Hughey – Steel guitar
 The Jordanaires – Background vocals
 Charlie McCoy – Harmonica
 Bill McElhiney – Trumpet
 Bob Moore – Electric bass

 Weldon Myrick – Steel guitar
 The Nashville Edition – Background vocals
 Jo Parker – Strings
 Leon Rhodes – Electric guitar
 George Richey – Housepiano, piano
 Hargus "Pig" Robbins – Piano
 Billy Sanford – Electric guitar, leader
 Zina Schiff – Strings
 Connie Smith – Lead vocals
 Henry Strzelecki – Electric bass
 Donald Teal – Strings
 David Vanderkooi – Cello
 Gary Van Osdale – Strings
 Pete Wade – Guitar
 Chip Young – Guitar

Technical personnel
 Bill Barnes – Design
 Lou Bradley – Engineer
 Shelly Kurland – String leader
 Slick Lawson – Photography
 Bill McElhiney – Arranger
 Peggy Owens – Design
 George Richey – Producer

Chart performance

Release history

References

Footnotes

Books

 

1973 albums
Albums produced by George Richey
Connie Smith albums
Columbia Records albums